Tuojiang or Tuo River, one of the major tributaries of the upper Yangtze River.

Tuojiang may refer to the following Chinese places:

 Tuojiang, Fenghuang, a town and the seat of Fenghuang County in Hunan
 Tuojiang, Jianghua, a town and the seat of Jianghua Yao Autonomous County in Hunan